Dillwynia floribunda  is a species of flowering plant in the family Fabaceae and is endemic to eastern Australia. It is an erect shrub with hairy stems, crowded, grooved, linear leaves and yellow flowers with red markings.

Description
The flowers are arranged in pairs in leaf axils near the ends of branches but often extending down the branches.

Taxonomy
Dillwynia floribunda was first formally described in 1805 by James Edward Smith in the Annals of Botany from specimens collected at Port Jackson. The specific epithet (floribunda) means "many flowers".

Distribution and habitat
This dillwynia mainly grows in heath and woodland and is found in coastal areas and on the Central Tablelands of New South, and in south-eastern Queensland.

References 

floribunda
Fabales of Australia
Flora of New South Wales
Flora of Queensland
Taxa named by James Edward Smith
Plants described in 1805